Au Revoir may refer to:

 "Au revoir", a French parting phrase

Entertainment
 "Au Revoir", the two part Christmas special of Auf Wiedersehen, Pet

Music
 "Au Revoir", a song from the 1967 musical Sherry!
 "Au Revoir", a song by Alain Morisod and Sweet People 1982
 "Au Revoir", a 1963 song by Gilbert Bécaud
 "Au Revoir", a song by Guy Boucher (actor)	
 "Au Revoir", a song by Lys Assia	1961
 "Au Revoir", a song by Noël (singer) 1979
 "Au Revoir", a song by Teresa Brewer	1954
 "Au Revoir", a song by Vince Hill	1966
 "Au Revoir", a 1997 Japanese single from Malice Mizer's album Merveilles
 "Au Revoir", a track on the 2008 album Flight of the Conchords
 "Au Revoir" (song), a 2011 single by Cascada from Original Me
 "Au Revoir", a song by Mark Forster featuring Sido 2014

Others
 Au Revoir, a character of one half of identical twin duo Bonjour and Au Revoir in Let's Go Luna!